Gütersloh is a Kreis (district) in the north-east of North Rhine-Westphalia, Germany. Neighboring districts are Osnabrück, Herford, district-free Bielefeld, Lippe, Paderborn, Soest and Warendorf.

History
It was created in 1973 in the reorganization of the districts in North Rhine-Westphalia, when the previous districts of Halle and Wiedenbrück were merged. Also the districts Bielefeld, Paderborn, Beckum und Warendorf had to cede parts of their area to the newly formed district. The precursor districts were created in 1816 after the new Prussian province of Westphalia was established.

Today, the district Gütersloh has one of Germany's largest exile communities of Assyrians.

Geography
The east of the district is covered by the Teutoburg Forest, which also contains the highest elevation of the district, the Hengeberg (316m). In the west there is the source of the Ems river. The Ems valley also contains the lowest point of the district, near Harsewinkel with 56m.

Coat of arms
The coat of arms was adopted with the creation of the district in 1973 by combining the symbols from the arms of the previous districts Halle and Rheda-Wiedenbrück. The three elements derive from the medieval counties in the area now covered by the district.
The golden eagle in the bottom of the coat comes from the duchy of Rietberg. The wheel in the middle derives from the sign of the city Osnabrück, which owned the Amt Reckenberg. The chevrons in the top part are the symbol of the duchy of Ravensberg.

Towns and municipalities

Economy
Some important companies are located in the district of Guetersloh:
 Beckhoff Automation Technology
 Bertelsmann Media
 Claas Combine harvesters
 Gerry Weber Fashion
 Miele Consumer electronic goods
 Nobilia International Kitchens
 Storck Candies
 Telefonica Internet Services
 Tönnies Meat Processors

References

External links

Official website (German)

 
Districts of North Rhine-Westphalia